Marcel Keller Gil (born 8 May 1990) is a Portuguese male indoor volleyball player.

Currently plays in Austria ( Raiffeisen Bank Waldviertel) and also for the Portuguese National Team since 2005.

During his career he has played professionally in Portugal, Spain, Germany, France, Argentina, Romania and Austria and played over 150 games for his national team.

His debut in national team was in European League 2009 with whom he won the Bronze Medal in the same year and Gold medal in 2010.

External links
 profile at FIVB.org

1990 births
Living people
People from Oeiras, Portugal
Portuguese men's volleyball players
S.L. Benfica volleyball players
Sportspeople from Lisbon District